QuteCom (previously called WengoPhone) was a free-software SIP-compliant VoIP client developed by the QuteCom (previously OpenWengo) community under the GPL-2.0-or-later license. It allows users to speak to other users of SIP-compliant VoIP software at no cost. It also allows users to call landlines and cell phones, send SMS and make video calls. None of these functions are tied to a particular provider, allowing users to choose among any SIP provider.

History
Development on WengoPhone began in September 2004. The first published version was released as version 0.949. A next-generation version of WengoPhone (WengoPhone NG) began development in 2005. The last release of WengoPhone before the change to QuteCom was version 2.1.2. A WengoPhone Firefox plug-in has also been published, which is currently available on Mac OS X and Microsoft Windows, with a Linux version under development.

On 28 January 2008, Wengo, the original sponsor of WengoPhone, transferred the sponsorship of the project to MBDSYS, and it became known as QuteCom.

On 15 May 2008, osAlliance presented kvats as a branded 2.2 version of WengoPhone/QuteCom with the preferred SIP provider A1, a brand of mobilkom Austria.

As of 29 July 2016 the domain qutecom.com is registered with a domain broker.  Whois seems to indicate this happened on 30 March 2016.

Calls
PC-to-PC calls have Hi-Fi quality and use several codecs such as iLBC, G.711 (PCMA or PCMU), G.722, AMR (license needed), AMR-WB (license needed), G.729 (license needed). It is possible to start a conversation with other users of the same software or any other software that is SIP-compliant such as Gizmo. QuteCom also allows users to make video calls using FFmpeg. Supported video codec is H.263. Since version 2.1, QuteCom allows IM chats with MSN, YIM, AIM, ICQ and XMPP users. This has been achieved by using the libpurple library.

Concerning calls to landlines, the default server configuration is the one from Wengo, which was the primary sponsor of the OpenWengo project. After the release of version 2.1, QuteCom could be used with any SIP provider. This gives users an economic advantage, as they can choose the SIP provider according to how much the provider charges per minute and not according to the software they use.

User interface
The GUI is similar to those of other VoIP softphones such as Gizmo5 or Skype. From the main GUI, tabs allow access to the contact list, recent calls list, and user account information. Technically, it is written in Python and Qt/C++ programming languages.

Features
The features of QuteCom are:

 SIP compliance
 Provider agnostic
 Allows users to send SMS to France
 NAT traversal
 Cross-platform
 Audio smileys
 Qt-based GUI
 Chatting with MSN, AIM, ICQ, Yahoo and XMPP users
 Encryption via SRTP, but key exchange over Everbee key that is not a Standard
 Uses standard Session Initiation Protocol

Limitations
The main limitations of the QuteCom are:
 Lack of true privacy features such as encryption. A beta AES-128 encryption using SRTP is available since 2.1 version of QuteCom
 Does not support H.261 and sends wrong H.263 packets, preventing communication with other videophones
 Does not support audio conferences with more than three people
 Key Exchange for encryption is not a standard, so it works only between QuteCom clients

See also

 Comparison of VoIP software
 Blink
 Ekiga
 Empathy (software)
 Jitsi
 Wengo SIP Service

References

4. Binary files for Windows and source code

Instant messaging clients that use Qt
Voice over IP clients that use Qt
Videoconferencing software that uses Qt
Free instant messaging clients
Free VoIP software
MacOS instant messaging clients
Windows instant messaging clients
Discontinued Mozilla plug-ins
Videotelephony